Shankarpur is a beach village located 14 km east of Digha in West Bengal, India. It is also a regular fishing harbour. Shankarpur contains a number of temples.

Geography

Location
Shankarpur is located in the Purba (East) Medinipur District of the state of West Bengal, Shankarpur is a beach destination along the Digha-Contai Road which is fast gaining popularity. It is at a distance of about 185 km from the capital city Kolkata, and about 14 km from the famous beach town Digha.

Transport

Bus service
There is frequent bus service to Digha from Dharmatala bus stand of Kolkata and many other parts of West Bengal. It is almost a 5-hour journey from Kolkata. 
Bus service is also available from towns across West Bengal such as Midnapore, Bankura, Asansol, Bardhaman, Howrah and, also from Orissa via Balasore (Baleswar).
Nearest bus stops of Shankarpur are "14 Mile" or at "Ramnagar". From both of the places tracker service or van service is available.

Train service

 2857  Tamralipta express Howrah  Dep time 6:40AM Digha flag station 10 AM
 8001  Kandari express Howrah  Dep time 7:50AM Digha flag station 12 PM
 5722  Paharia express Howrah  Dep time 2:15PM Digha flag station 5:50 PM
 12847 Duronto Express Howrah Dep time 11:15AM Digha flag station 2.15 PM

Shankarpur  picture gallery

References

External links 

 
Best Hotel In Shankarpur

Villages in Purba Medinipur district
Tourist attractions in Purba Medinipur district
Beaches of West Bengal